Siri is a Scandinavian feminine given name. It is a short form of Sigrid, from Old Norse  Sigríðr,
composed of the elements sigr "victory" and fríðr "beautiful". 
The variant Siri has been widely used since the Middle Ages, 
it was common in Norway until the 18th century, when its usage declined, but saw new high popularity in the 20th century.
It is now a common name in Norway and  Sweden. In Sweden the name gained new popularity around 1900, and has again become increasingly popular in the last years. 
The Faroese equivalent is Sirið; the ð is not pronounced; the spelling without ð is also common.
To a lesser extent it is also used in Denmark.

Siri, a virtual assistant created by Apple Inc., derives its name from the Scandinavian name Siri, inspired by creator Dag Kittlaus's Norwegian heritage.

Seeri is also very common word in rural Punjab and it means a person who is paid to assist in farming.
 
Siri is also an unrelated Indian feminine given name. It is a Telugu and  Kannada word, meaning wealth or fortune. It is a popular given name in Andhra Pradesh , Telangana and Karnataka.
Siri is also a Thai neutral given name. It is a cognate with the Indian name and has the same meaning.

People
 Siri Bjerke, Norwegian cabinet minister
 Siri Broch Johansen, Norwegian author
 Siri Dokken, Norwegian artist
 Siri von Essen, Swedish actress and wife of August Strindberg.
 Siri Hustvedt, American author
 Siri Lindley, American triathlete and coach
 Siri Nilsen (born 1985), Norwegian singer, songwriter, musician, and voice actress

Others
 Siri, a virtual assistant created by Apple Inc.

References

Old Norse personal names
Norwegian feminine given names